Michelangelo Pisani di Massa e di Mormile (24 March 1933), count of Massa Lubrense and Mormile, is an Italian diplomat.

Biography 
He graduated in law in 1954 and entered the diplomatic career in 1960.

During his career, he was posted to the Permanent Representation of Italy to the United Nations in New York, at the Consulate of Grenoble and at the Italian embassies in Bogotà and Tel Aviv. In 1971 he was nominated as Consul General in Hong Kong and in 1980 he was at the Italian Embassy in Washington.
He served as Italian Ambassador to Chile from 1989 to 1995.

From 1995 to 1997 he was Ambassador of Italy to Turkey.

He retired from the diplomatic career in 1998.

Honors
 Grand Officer of the Order of Merit of the Italian Republic – December 27, 1985

See also 
 Ministry of Foreign Affairs (Italy)
 Foreign relations of Italy

References

1933 births
Living people
Nobility from Naples
Knights of Malta
Ambassadors of Italy to Chile
Ambassadors of Italy to Turkey
Diplomats from Naples
Italian diplomats
20th-century diplomats